Reaction of degeneration is a medical condition caused by a change in the electrical response of the muscles due to muscle denervation.

Characteristics
Lack of muscle response.

The muscle is not able to irritation by AC, but irritated by DC.

The muscle contractility from anode is greater than cathode.

References

Nerves